Frank Fernández may refer to:

 Frank Michael Fernández Jr. (born 1918), educator, historian, and Isleño advocate
 Frank Fernández (writer) (born 1930), Cuban-American author of a history of Cuban anarchism
 Frank Fernández (baseball) (born 1943), former Major League Baseball catcher
 Frank Fernández (pianist) (born 1944), Cuban pianist and composer
 Frank Fernández Pardo (born 1992), Chilean footballer

See also
 Francisco Fernández (disambiguation)